James Eadie was a Scottish amateur football wing half and full back who played in the Scottish League for Queen's Park.

Personal life 
Eadie had three brothers who each played football – Alexander, David and William.

Career statistics

References

Year of birth missing
Scottish footballers
Scottish Football League players
Association football wing halves
Queen's Park F.C. players
Place of death missing
Date of death missing
Place of birth missing
Association football fullbacks